The Suzuki RG250 was a two-cylinder, 250 cc, two-stroke sports motorcycle produced by Suzuki Motor Corporation from 1978 until 1982.  First released in 1978 with the RG125 and RG250 to replace the popular GT125 and GT185.  The RG250 was a completely new bike when compared to the GT series. Power was improved slightly over the GT250 X7 and weight was reduced by 20 kg leading to a standing 1/4 mile (400m) acceleration of 14.2 seconds.

The success of the RG250 was followed by the release of the RG250 Gamma in 1983.

References

RG250